South-West Irish English (also known as South-West Hiberno-English) is a class of broad varieties of English spoken in Ireland's South-West Region (the province of Munster). Within Ireland, the varieties are best associated with  either the urban working class of the South-West or traditional rural Ireland in general, and they are popularly identified by their specific city or county, such as Cork English, Kerry English, or Limerick English.

Phonology
This intonation is a slightly higher pitch followed by a significant drop in pitch on stressed long-vowel syllables (across multiple syllables or even within a single one), which is popularly heard in rapid conversation, by other English-speakers, as an undulating "sing-song" quality. 

Certain South-West features may also exist in Ireland outside that region but typically only in rural areas. An example is the backing, slight lowering, and perhaps rounding of  towards , so that, to a Dublin or General American speaker, about nears the sound of a boat. Those varieties are all rhotic, like most other Irish accents, but the  sound is specifically a velarised alveolar approximant: . (Among some very traditional speakers, other possible  variants include a "tapped R", the alveolar tap , or even a "uvular R", the voiced uvular fricative , in rural south-central Ireland.) 

Furthermore, for all of those varieties,  and  may also lack a rounded quality, the lexical set  is very fronted, the  may be dropped before  (hue pronounced like you), a distinction remains between tern and turn, and <w> and <wh> remain separate sounds.

Grammar
South-West Irish English allows the use of a do be habitual aspect. Examples include I do be thinking about it or she does be late and replace Standard English constructions of those sentences: I think about it (often) or she is late (usually).

Non-canonical constituent order is also possible,in which a sentence may be arranged as Thinking to steal a few eggs I was (rather than I was thinking to steal a few eggs) to give the first clause salience or emphasis.

References

Culture in County Cork
Culture in County Kerry
Dialects of English
Languages of Ireland
Irish culture